The 2010 CHA Men's Ice Hockey Tournament was played on March 12 and March 13, 2010 at Dwyer Arena in Lewiston, New York. The winner received College Hockey America's automatic bid to the 2010 NCAA Division I Men's Ice Hockey Tournament.  Alabama–Huntsville defeated hosts Niagara, 3–2, in overtime to win their second CHA Tournament title.

2010 marked the final men's tournament for the CHA, as the conference would disband its men's division after the season.

Format
The tournament will featured two rounds of play. In the first round, the first and fourth seeds and second and third seeds will each play for a berth in the championship game. The winners of the championship, played on March 13, 2010, will receive an automatic bid to the 2010 NCAA Division I Men's Ice Hockey Tournament.

Conference standings
Note: GP = Games played; W = Wins; L = Losses; T = Ties; PTS = Points; GF = Goals For; GA = Goals Against

Bracket

Note: * denotes overtime period(s)

All times are local (EST).

Semifinals

Third place

Championship

Tournament awards

All-Tournament Team
Goaltender: Cameron Talbot (Alabama–Huntsville)
Defensemen: Tyler Gotto (Niagara)
Forwards: Cody Campbell (UAH), Ron Cramer (Robert Morris), Ryan Cramer (Bemidji St.), Chris Moran (Niagara)

MVP
Cameron Talbot (Alabama–Huntsville)

References

External links
Official tournament website

Cha Men's Ice Hockey Tournament
CHA Men's Ice Hockey Tournament
Ice hockey in New York (state)
College sports in New York (state)
CHA Men's Ice Hockey